Sebastian Ghasemi-Nobakht (born 11 October 1985, in Göttingen) is an Iranian footballer who plays as a striker for CFC Hertha 06.

Personal life
Sebastian's younger brother Rubic is also a footballer.

Career statistics

References

1985 births
Living people
Iranian footballers
German footballers
VfB Oldenburg players
SpVgg Greuther Fürth players
Rot Weiss Ahlen players
German people of Iranian descent
Oberliga (football) players
Regionalliga players
2. Bundesliga players
3. Liga players
Sportspeople of Iranian descent
Association football forwards
Sportspeople from Göttingen